This is a list of all the models photographed for Playboy magazine. Not all of the women who have modeled in Playboy have done so in the nude.

The list has been split up into several articles by decade of publication.  Please see the following articles for names and date of appearance:

List of people in Playboy 1953–1959
List of people in Playboy 1960–1969
List of people in Playboy 1970–1979
List of people in Playboy 1980–1989
List of people in Playboy 1990–1999
List of people in Playboy 2000–2009
List of people in Playboy 2010–2020

See also
Playboy Playmate
List of glamour models

Lists of female models
Lists of entertainers
Lists of people by magazine appearance